The Kenter was a German automobile manufactured from 1923 until 1925.  Successor to the Komet, it was available in either an sv four with 1060 cc Steudel engine or an Atos-engined model of 1305 cc.

References
David Burgess Wise, The New Illustrated Encyclopedia of Automobiles

Defunct motor vehicle manufacturers of Germany